This is a list of active and extinct volcanoes in China.

Volcanic Fields in China
The Arshan volcanic field  is found in the Greater Khingan mountain range, it contains more than 40 cenozoic volcanic cones. 
The Honggeertu volcanic field consists of 12 cinder cones which may be holocene 
The Jingbo volcanic field is in the Jingpo Lake region of Heilongjiang Province
The Keluo volcanic field may have had historic eruptions 
The Kunlun Volcanic Group last had an eruption on 27 May 1951, and consists of at least 70 pyroclastic cones 
The Longgang volcanic field contains 150 scoria cones but only one of holocene age 
the Qionglei volcano group (also known as the Leiqiong volcanic field) stretches across the Qiongzhou Strait north of Hainan Dao Island - so is made up of two parts:
 The Hainan Dao volcanic field is the southern part consisting of 58 Pleistocene-Holocene tholeiitic cones
 The Leizhou Bandao volcanic field is the northern part including the stratovolcanoes Tiangyang and Yingfengling as well as several pyroclastic cones, it lies just west of Zhanjiang City
The Rehai geothermal field which is part of the Tengchong volcanic district (Tengchong) has had 20 hydrothermal eruptions since 1993 
The Tianshan volcano group contains the historically active cone Pechan
The Wudalianchi volcanic field erupted in 1720-1721 forming the five lakes at Wudalianchi, and again in 1776

See also 
 List of mountains in China

References 

China

Volcanoes
Volcanoes